Mountain Line is a public transit system providing service to the community of Missoula, Montana and the University of Montana. The legal name of Mountain Line is the Missoula Urban Transportation District, which is governed by a board whose members are appointed by the City of Missoula and Missoula County.

History 
The Missoula Urban Transportation District (MUTD) was established via a ballot measure in June 1976. The MUTD formed the Mountain Line and began operating buses in December 1977.

On January 5, 2015, the Mountain Line began a three-year demonstration project that provided free bus service to all passengers. The project costs $460,000 annually and is funded by the city of Missoula, the University of Montana, and 12 other community partners. By the end of the year, the service saw a 38 percent increase in ridership, with 300,000 additional passengers.

Services 
Mountain Line operates 13 fixed routes on weekdays, 11 of which also operate on Saturdays. There is no service on Sundays or most major holidays. 15-minute frequent transit service is available on the Bolt! Route while most other routes operate on 30- or 60-minute schedules. During the Saturdays in the summer, Mountain Line also operates a trolley to two farmers' markets and a craft market in downtown Missoula. Additionally, Mountain Line operates a trolley to "Out to Lunch," an outdoor concert series on Wednesdays during the summer. Paratransit service is provided for people with disabilities who are unable to ride fixed-route buses.

Route list 
Bolt! 1 Downtown / University / Community Hospital
Bolt! 2 Target Plaza / Southgate Mall
Route 3 Northside
Route 4 East Broadway Park and Ride / East Missoula / Bonner
Route 5 Rattlesnake
Route 6 Higgins / Dornblaser / Opportunity Resources / Southgate Mall
Route 7 Downtown / Southgate Mall
Route 8 Adams Center / 5th / 6th / Southgate Mall
Route 9 Good Food Store / Target Range / Community Hospital
Route 11 N Reserve St / Expressway / Airport
Route 12 Downtown / University / Dornblaser / South Hills
Route 14 Broadway / Russell

Facilities

Head office 
Address: 1221 Shakespeare Street, Missoula
Coordinates: 
Facilities: Head office, administration, bus storage and maintenance
Opened: 1980

Transfer center 
Address: 200 West Pine Street, Missoula
Coordinates: 
Facilities: Transfer point, waiting area, restrooms
Opened: 2000

Park-and-ride lots 
Lewis and Clark (Route 12)
Coordinates: 
Dornblaser (Routes 1, 6, 12)
Coordinates:

References

External links 
MountainLine.com – official website
Missoula Urban Transportation District Board of Directors

Bus transportation in Montana
Paratransit services in the United States
Transportation in Missoula County, Montana
1976 establishments in Montana